Dierhagen is a municipality in the Vorpommern-Rügen district, in Mecklenburg-Vorpommern, Germany.
Among the approximately 1,600 inhabitants is Egon Krenz, briefly the leader of the GDR, who has lived there since 2006.

Location 
Dierhagen is on the Fischland-Darß-Zingst peninsula. The district is surrounded by the Baltic Sea to the north and northwest and the Saaler Bodden to the east and southeast.

Dierhagen has six districts:
 Dierhagen Dorf
 Dierhagen Strand, a 7-km-long beach with fine white sand
 Dierhagen Ost
 Neuhaus
 Dändorf 
 Körkwitz

History 
Dierhagen was founded in 1311 when German settlers expanded their territory into the area of Ribnitz (moved eastward).

References

External links 

 Dierhagen website, accessed 20. December 2017

Seaside resorts in Germany
Populated coastal places in Germany (Baltic Sea)